Bellator 261: Johnson vs. Moldavsky was a mixed martial arts event produced by Bellator MMA that took place on June 25, 2021, at Mohegan Sun Arena in Uncasville, Connecticut.

Background 
With current heavyweight champion Ryan Bader moving on in the Bellator Light Heavyweight World Grand Prix Tournament, Timothy Johnson and Valentin Moldavsky competed for an Bellator Interim Heavyweight World Championship.

A title eliminator women's flyweight bout between Liz Carmouche and Kana Watanabe served as the co-main of the event.

A light heavyweight bout between Christian Edwards and Ben Parrish was scrapped after weigh-ins at Bellator 259 after Edwards wasn't cleared to compete by the Mohegan Sun Athletic Commission. After being cleared by a commission doctor on May 26, the bout was rebooked for this event.

The reigning WBC Muaythai World Featherweight champion Lena Ovchynnikova was scheduled to fight Kyra Batara in the event prelims. However, the bout was cancelled the week of the event with one of Batara's corner testing positive for COVID-19.

A featherweight bout between Keoni Diggs and two-time Bellator Featherweight title challenger Daniel Weichel was announced for the main card.

A middleweight bout between Taylor Johnson and Lance Wright was to take place at  Bellator 260. However, a week before the event it was announced that it was moved to this event.

Light heavyweight bouts between Simon Biyong and Lee Chadwick and Christian Edwards and Ben Parrish were scheduled for this show. However, Chadwick tested positive for COVID-19 and Parrish had to pull out of the bout, so Biyong and Edwards were matched with each other.

Results

See also 

 2021 in Bellator MMA
 List of Bellator MMA events
 List of current Bellator fighters
 Bellator MMA Rankings

References 

Bellator MMA events
Events in Uncasville, Connecticut
2021 in mixed martial arts
June 2021 sports events in the United States
2021 in sports in Connecticut
Mixed martial arts in Connecticut
Sports competitions in Connecticut